Air curtain may refer to:

 Air door, a fan-powered device used for separating two spaces from each other
 Pneumatic barrier for containing oil spills

See also
 Curtain (disambiguation)